Sunny Ducrow is a 1919 novel by English author Henry St. John Cooper. It follows Elizabeth Ann "Sunny" Ducrow, a pleasant, clever, and driven teenager from the London slums who left her backbreaking factory job to become a stage performer, and later, a successful business owner.

Main characters
Elizabeth Ann "Sunny" Ducrow: A semi-literate orphan, Sunny was working in a pickle factory at age 16 when a chance encounter with Leslie Montressor led her to become an actress. Sunny's confidence and ambition propelled her upward; her kind and loyal nature won her many friends and connections. She confronted every obstacle with a smile. After her career at the first theatre company ended, she managed to land a job at the Realm, the biggest theatre group in England. After she became one of the biggest stage stars, she even delved into the business world: she invested in her former pickle company and built cottages for the workers. 
Albert "Bert" Jackson: Sunny's best buddy from the slums. A dejected and awkward fellow, he was always supported by Sunny. He later achieved success as a playwright and married Evy.
Mrs. Melkin: Sunny's aunt and only relative. A grumpy and sentimental widow, she later married Porkey.
Stanley Alwyn, Viscount Dobrington: Sunny's first love. Despite his aristocratic status he fell for Sunny, but his fickleness and distrust in her ended their relationship.
Evelyn "Evy" Clifforde: Another actress at the Realm. Once Sunny's rival, she became Sunny's best friend and flatmate. She later married Bert.
Arthur Curtiss: Mr. Barstowe's secretary. He fell in love with Sunny and they got together by the novel's end.
Mr. Barstowe: Owner of the Realm and the "King of the Music Hall World". He also farmed on his days "off".
Lady Blessendale: Countess and Stanley's overprotective mother. 
Max Hemmingway: Theatre manager.
Felix Rostheimer: Hemmingway's depraved German financer.
Leslie Montressor: Star performer under Hemmingway who discovered Sunny. She later left for America.
Mr. Johnson: Owner of the pickle factory.
Edward "Porkey" Porkberry: Gatekeeper at the Realm. He later married Mrs. Melkin.

Reception
Mary Cadogan considered it an "attractive account." G. I. Colbron of Publishers Weekly praised the writing as "sincere and simple in style". The New York Times wrote: "In Sunny Ducrow Henry St. John barely escapes unwittingly surpassing the 'novels' that first established Stephen Leacock's reputation."

Adaptation
In 1926, the novel was made into a Hollywood film, Sunny Side Up, starring Vera Reynolds as Sunny Ducrow.

References

External links
Sunny Ducrow (full text)

1919 British novels
Novels set in London
British novels adapted into films
Novels about orphans
Novels about actors